Sherbet is the second mini-album by the Japanese girl group Buono!. It was released on August 22, 2012.

Background 
The album was released in two versions: Limited Edition (CD+DVD) and Regular Edition (CD only). Never Gonna Stop! is the ending theme for the Japan-based sports program, Bowling Revolution P★League.

Track listing

References

External links 
 Album profile at UP-FRONT WORKS discography
 Album profile at Hello! Project discography

2012 EPs
Buono! albums
Zetima EPs